Khosla  is a Punjabi Khatri surname found in North India. Notable people who bear the name and may or may not be associated with the community include:

 Anil Khosla, Former Vice Chief of air staff of the indian air force
 Aaital Khosla (born 1993), Indian model and beauty queen
 Neeru Khosla (born 1955/1956), co-founder of the non-profit CK12 Foundation
 Pradeep Khosla, Indian American computer scientist
 Raj Khosla (1925-1991), Indian film director
 Rohit Khosla (1958-1994), Indian fashion designer
 Sanjay Khosla, Indian-American engineer
 Vinod Khosla (born 1955), Indian-born American venture capitalist
 Divya Khosla Kumar (born 1987), Indian Actress, Producer, and Director

See also 
 Khosla Ka Ghosla, an Indian film
 Khosla Commission, a one-man commission established in India in July 1970 to re-investigate the death of Subhas Chandra Bose

References

Indian surnames
Khatri clans
Punjabi tribes
Surnames
Surnames of Indian origin
Punjabi-language surnames
Hindu surnames
Khatri surnames